Powerful Chief is a 2020 Peruvian drama film directed by Henry Vallejo. It was selected as the Peruvian entry for the Best International Feature Film at the 94th Academy Awards.

Plot
After arriving in Puno, Elisban struggles to find work and a sense of belonging.

See also
 List of submissions to the 94th Academy Awards for Best International Feature Film
 List of Peruvian submissions for the Academy Award for Best International Feature Film

References

External links
 

2020 films
2020 drama films
Peruvian drama films
2020s Peruvian films
2020s Spanish-language films

Films about poverty